The 2022–23 Horizon League men's basketball season began with practices in September 2022 and ended with the 2023 Horizon League men's basketball tournament in March 2023. This wase the 43rd season for Horizon League men's basketball. This was the first season in conference history with 11 teams, as UIC departed for the Missouri Valley Conference following the 2021-22 season.

Head coaches

Coaching changes 
 On March 2, 2022, Milwaukee fired head coach Pat Baldwin after five seasons with the team. On March 18, the Panthers hired Division II Queens head coach Bart Lundy to be their next head coach.
 On March 22, 2022, Cleveland State head coach Dennis Gates left the team to become the head coach at Missouri. On April 5, the Vikings hired Iowa State assistant coach Daniyal Robinson to be their next head coach.
 On January 31, 2023, Green Bay fired head coach Will Ryan after three seasons and a 2–19 start. Assistant coach Freddie Owens was named interim head coach.

Coaches 

Notes:

 Year at school includes 2022–23 season.
 Records are prior to 2022–23 season.

Preseason

Preseason coaches poll

Preseason All-Horizon League 

Preseason Player of the Year: Antoine Davis, Detroit Mercy

Regular season

Player of the Week awards

Conference matrix

Early season tournaments 
The following table summarizes the multiple-team events (MTE) or early season tournaments in which teams from the Horizon League will participate.

Postseason

Horizon League tournament

The conference tournament will be played from February 28 to March 6, 2023. The first round and quarterfinals are hosted at campus sites, while the semifinals and finals are held at Indiana Farmers Coliseum in Indianapolis, Indiana. Teams are seeded by conference record, with ties broken by record between the tied teams followed by record against the regular-season champion, if necessary. The top five teams receive a bye to the quarterfinals and the bracket is re-seeded after every round.

NCAA Tournament
The conference champion receives an automatic bid to the 2023 NCAA Division I men's basketball tournament.

National Invitation Tournament 
Youngstown State received an automatic bid to the 2023 National Invitation Tournament as the team with the best regular season record who failed to win the conference tournament.

College Basketball Invitational 
Both Cleveland State and Milwaukee accepted bids to the 2023 College Basketball Invitational after both teams finished as runner-up and semifinalists in the conference tournament, respectively.

National awards

Preseason watchlists
Below is a table of notable preseason watch lists.

Midseason watchlists
Below is a table of notable midseason watch lists.

Conference awards

References